Gronau is a river of Hesse, Germany and a right tributary of the Sinn.

Course
The Gronau rises in the unincorporated area Gutsbezirk Spessart in the Hessian part of the Mittelgebirge Spessart. It flows into the Sinn at Altengronau.

See also
List of rivers of Hesse

References

External links

Rivers of Hesse
Rivers of the Spessart
Rivers of Germany